Macrodiplax is a genus of dragonflies in the family Libellulidae. 
It is found across the tropics and subtropics, however it is not found in Africa.

Species
The genus Macrodiplax includes only two species:

References

Libellulidae
Anisoptera genera
Odonata of Oceania
Odonata of Asia
Odonata of Australia
Taxa named by Friedrich Moritz Brauer